The Wreck-Age is the fifth studio album by British heavy metal band Tygers of Pan Tang, produced in 1985 on Music for Nations.

Track listing

Personnel
Band members
Jon Deverill - lead and backing vocals
Steve Lamb - guitar, backing vocals
Neil Shepherd - guitar
Dave Donaldson - bass, backing vocals
Brian Dick - drums

Additional musicians
Steve Thompson- keyboards, bass guitar (uncredited)
Ian Curnow - keyboards and programming
Graham Lee - backing vocals

Production
Phil Harding - producer, engineer, mixing

References

1985 albums
Tygers of Pan Tang albums
Music for Nations albums